Lauren Amy Parfitt (born 1 April 1994) is a Welsh cricketer who is currently captain of Wales, as well as playing for Western Storm. She plays as a right-handed batter and occasional slow left-arm orthodox bowler.

Early life
Parfitt was born on 1 April 1994 in Pontypool, Wales. Her sister, Georgia, plays for Wales alongside her.

Domestic career
Parfitt made her debut for Wales in 2007 against Worcestershire in the County Challenge Cup. In 2011, she was her side's leading run-scorer in the County Championship, with 132 runs. In 2013, she hit her maiden half-century for the side, scoring 52 against Devon. In 2014 she took her maiden five-wicket haul, taking 5/20 from 10 overs before hitting 31* in Wales' 9-wicket victory over Worcestershire.

In 2015 she was the ninth-highest run-scorer across the County Championship, with 268 runs including her maiden List A century, 109* made against Essex. She was also her side's leading run-scorer in the 2015 Women's Twenty20 Cup, with 161 runs. In 2016, Parfitt was her side's leading run-scorer across both competitions. Parfitt became captain of Wales in 2017, and led the side to promotion to Division 1 of the Twenty20 Cup in 2018. In 2019, she scored 177 runs in the County Championship, including two half-centuries. In 2021, Parfitt was Wales' leading run-scorer in the 2021 Women's Twenty20 Cup, with 149 runs including 70*, made against Somerset. She played seven matches for the side in the 2022 Women's Twenty20 Cup, scoring 80 runs and taking 7 wickets.

Parfitt was also in Western Storm's squad in the Women's Cricket Super League in 2017 and 2018, but did not play a match for the side.

In 2020, Parfitt returned to Western Storm for the Rachael Heyhoe Flint Trophy. She appeared in 5 matches, scoring 89 runs at an average of 22.25, with a high score of 33*. In 2021 she was retained in the squad, and scored 91 in a Rachael Heyhoe Flint Trophy match against Central Sparks as well as taking 3 wickets at an average of 27.66 in the Charlotte Edwards Cup. She played one match for Western Storm in 2022, against Lightning in the Rachael Heyhoe Flint Trophy, scoring 9 runs and taking two wickets.

References

External links

1994 births
Living people
Sportspeople from Pontypool
Welsh women cricketers
Wales women cricketers
Western Storm cricketers